Stenodactylus is a genus of Middle-Eastern and North-African geckos, commonly known as short-fingered geckos.

Classification of genus Stenodactylus
Iranian short-fingered gecko, Stenodactylus affinis 
Middle Eastern short-fingered gecko, Stenodactylus doriae 
Jordan short-fingered gecko, Stenodactylus grandiceps 
Southern short-fingered gecko, Stenodactylus leptocosymbotes 
Stenodactylus mauritanicus 
Anderson's short-fingered gecko, Stenodactylus petrii 
Slevin's short-fingered gecko, Stenodactylus slevini  
Stenodactylus stenurus  
Lichtenstein's short-fingered gecko, Stenodactylus sthenodactylus  
Yemen short-fingered gecko, Stenodactylus yemenensis

References

 
Lizard genera
Taxa named by Leopold Fitzinger